Douglas Arthur Smith (born June 13, 1960 in Mesic, North Carolina) is a former National Football League defensive tackle who played eight seasons for the Houston Oilers. He also played for the Birmingham Stallions of the United States Football League. Doug was famous for having timely injuries during big moments of a game leading some to think he would fake it to give the defense or himself time to rest.

External links
NFL.com player page

1960 births
Living people
People from Pamlico County, North Carolina
American football defensive tackles
Auburn Tigers football players
Houston Oilers players
Birmingham Stallions players
Players of American football from North Carolina
National Football League replacement players
Ed Block Courage Award recipients